Orenburzhie is a commercial airline headquartered in Orenburg, Russia, on the ground of Orenburg Airport. It serves as regular and charter passenger airline out of Orenburg and Izhevsk Airport.

History
On 11 August 2010, the property complex of the airport was separated from the structure of FSUE Orenburg Airlines and the FSUE International Airport Orenburg was registered. An-2 aircraft, Mi-2, Mi-8T, Mi-8P and Ka-226 helicopters were also transferred to the balance of the new enterprise.

To resume regional traffic, three new L-410 aircraft manufactured by Aircraft Industries were purchased on lease (received in February-March 2013), registered and certified, flight and engineering personnel were retrained.

On 4 October 2012 FSUE "International airport" Orenburg "was transferred to the ownership of the Orenburg region and renamed into the State Unitary Enterprise of the Orenburg region" Airport Orenburg ".

On 1 April 2013, the airline commenced flights from Orenburg to Yekaterinburg, Kazan, Nizhny Novgorod, Orsk, Perm, Samara, Tyumen, Ufa, Chelyabinsk, and then from September to Saratov, and finally in October 2013 to Aktobe. On 22 October 2013, the airline was registered as a foreign carrier in the Republic of Kazakhstan, and from November 18 it began operating flights on the Orenburg - Aktobe route.

As of 2017, Orenburzhye was supposed to receive 8 Embraer 190 on lease from Air Canada in favor of a Sukhoi Superjet 100 order, however this never materialized.

Destinations
Orenburzhye serves the following scheduled destinations:

Kotlas - Kotlas Airport

Ufa - Ufa International Airport

Belgorod - Belgorod International Airport

Chelyabinsk - Balandino Airport 

Simferopol - Simferopol Airport 

Kaluga - Grabtsevo Airport

Petrozavodsk - Besovets Airport

Kirov - Pobedilovo Airport

Anapa - Vityazevo Airport
Krasnodar - Pashkovsky Airport
Sochi - Adler-Sochi International Airport

Lipetsk - Lipetsk Airport

Omsk - Omsk Tsentralny Airport

Orenburg - Orenburg Tsentralny Airport Base
Orsk - Orsk Airport

Perm - Bolshoye Savino Airport

Rostov-on-Don - Rostov-on-Don Airport

Samara - Kurumoch International Airport

Yekaterinburg - Koltsovo Airport

Kazan - Kazan International Airport
Nizhnekamsk - Begishevo Airport

Nizhnevartovsk - Nizhnevartovsk Airport
Uray - Uray Airport

Izhevsk - Izhevsk Airport

Voronezh - Gumrak Airport

Voronezh - Chertovitskoye Airport

Yaroslavl - Tunoshna Airport

Aktobe - Aktobe Airport

Buguruslan - Buguruslan Airfield 
Cheboksary - Cheboksary Airport
Gelendzhik - Gelendzhik Airport
Nizhny Novgorod - Strigino Airport
Nyagan - Nyagan Airport
Saratov - Saratov Tsentralny Airport
Stavropol - Shpakovskoye Airport
Tyumen - Roshchino Airport

Fleet

The Orenburzhye fleet consists of the following aircraft:

References

External links
Official website 

Airlines of Russia
Companies based in Orenburg Oblast